Shazna (stylized as SHAZNA) is a Japanese visual kei rock band originally active from 1993 to 2000. Originally having a strong gothic rock influence, the band's sound greatly shifted to a more new wave direction by 1996. At their peak, they were considered one of "the big four of visual kei" alongside La'cryma Christi, Fanatic Crisis and Malice Mizer. Their 1998 major label debut album Gold Sun and Silver Moon reached the number two position on the Oricon chart, sold over a million copies and was named "Rock Album of the Year" at the Japan Gold Disc Awards. In 2006, Shazna reunited, though after releasing an album and a single they disbanded once again in 2009. In 2017, Shazna officially reunited again for their 20th anniversary.

History
Formed in 1993 with Izam on vocals, A・O・I on guitar, Niy on bass and Katsura on drums. Katsura left in 1996 and joined Baiser, leaving the trio. Perhaps the band's most notable feature was vocalist Izam and his choice of fashion; taking the cross-dressing feminine look to an extreme. Izam was largely influenced by Boy George and Culture Club, whom he later did a cover album of in 1998.

With the release of their major debut single "Melty Love" on August 27, 1997, Shazna gained immense popularity and many awards. It reached number two on the Oricon chart, earned them the "Best Newcomer" award from the Japan Cable Awards (Nihon Yusen Taisho) and helped their album Gold Sun and Silver Moon, which was named "Rock Album of the Year" by Japan Gold Disc Awards, be certified Million by the RIAJ. The album was named one of the top albums from 1989–1998 in a 2004 issue of the music magazine Band Yarouze.

In 1999, Izam married famous idol Hinano Yoshikawa, only to file for separation two months later and divorce two months after that. Both the marriage and divorce caused a scandal.

In October they released a cover of Ippu-Do's "Violet September Love" as a single. In 1999 Shazna signed to Toshiba EMI and released the album Pure Hearts in June. Their last single (and their second Christmas single) "Winter's Review" was released in December. In January 2000, a singles collection was released, however in October Shazna went on an activity pause.

The members all went in different musical directions. Izam, with a much less feminine look, became a solo singer and turned to acting, appearing in several films such as Chinese Dinner, G@me and Pretty Guardian Sailor Moon: Act Zero, a special episode of the live-action series based on the popular Sailor Moon manga. Back in 1998 Izam also had a cameo appearance in the Crayon Shin-chan movie Crayon Shin-chan: Blitzkrieg! Pig's Hoof's Secret Mission, which used Shazna's song "Pureness" as its theme song. A・O・I performs as an acoustic guitarist and singer, and became a filmmaker. Niy performs with the band Fanble.

In June 2006, after 6 years Shazna announced that they were reuniting. They held their first concert on September 5, 2006 and released the single "Heart" on April 25. They released the album 10th Melty Life on August 8, 2007, 10 years after the release of their major single debut "Melty Love". On November 3, 2008, Shazna announced that they would disband and played their last concert on March 22, 2009 at Shibuya O-East.

Shazna's song "Melty Love" was covered by BugLug on the compilation Crush! -90's V-Rock Best Hit Cover Songs-. The album was released on January 26, 2011 and features current visual kei bands covering songs from bands that were important to the '90s visual kei movement.

In August 2017, Shazna officially reunited for the 20th anniversary of their major label debut. In addition to Izam, A・O・I and Niy, their lineup includes three new female members; second vocalist Raychell, drummer Natsume and saxophonist Asuka.

Members
 Izam – vocals (1993–2000, 2006–2009, 2017–present)
 A・O・I – guitar (1993–2000, 2006–2009, 2017–present)
 Niy – bass guitar (1993–2000, 2006–2009, 2017–present)
 Raychell – vocals (2017–present)
  – drums (2017–present)
 Asuka – saxophone (2017–present)

Former members
  – drums (1993–1996)

Discography

Albums
 Sophia (November 30, 1994)
 Melty Case (March 14, 1996)
 Raspberry Time (August 1, 1996), Oricon Albums Chart Peak Position: No. 43
 Promise Eve (January 22, 1997) No. 16
 Gold Sun and Silver Moon (January 22, 1998) No. 2
 Pure Hearts (June 30, 1999) No. 15
 10th Melty Life (August 8, 2007)

Compilation albums
 Best Album 1993–2000: Oldies (January 1, 2000) No. 24
 Single Best Shazna & Izam (September 5, 2007, singles collection & Izam's solo)
 SHAZNA LOVE SELECTION - EP (December 12, 2014, ballads collection)

Singles
 "Stillness for Dear" (April 17, 1994, limited to 330 copies)
 "Dizziness" (December 8, 1995, limited to 500 copies)
 "Dizziness" (January 5, 1996, re-release with a B-side track, limited to 1000 copies)
 "Melty Love" (August 27, 1997), Oricon Singles Chart Peak Position: No. 2
Ending theme of 
  No. 2
Ending theme of 
 "White Silent Night" (December 3, 1997) No. 1
Ending theme of 
 "Sweet Heart Memory" (January 7, 1998) No. 2
Ending theme of 
 "Pureness" (April 22, 1998) No. 4
Theme song of Crayon Shin-chan: Blitzkrieg! Pig's Hoof's Secret Mission
 "Love is Alive/Dear Love" (April 29, 1998) No. 6
  No. 6
"Lover" - Ending theme of 
"Virgin" - Ending theme of 
 "Pink" (January 27, 1999) No. 15
Ending theme of 
 "Piece of Love" (March 31, 1999) No. 17
Theme song of Kamikaze Kaito Jeanne
  No. 20
 "Aqua" (September 22, 1999) No. 45
Ending theme of 
 "Winter's Review" (December 8, 1999) No. 44
Ending theme of the Japanese version of The Rugrats Movie

Demos
 "Enmity" (1993)
 "Shazna" (1993)
 "Voice of..." (January 9, 1994)

Videos
 
 Melty Love (October 8, 1997)
 Silent Beauty (January 1, 1998)
 Pure Hearts (April 28, 1999)
 Dear September Lovers Shazna Live at Budokan '98 (December 26, 1998)

References

External links
 Official website
 Aoi's official website

Visual kei musical groups
Japanese new wave musical groups
Japanese rock music groups
Japanese pop rock music groups
Musical groups established in 1993
Musical groups disestablished in 2000
Musical groups reestablished in 2006
Musical groups disestablished in 2009
Musical groups reestablished in 2017